The Trial of the Chicago 7 (Music from the Netflix Film) is the soundtrack to the 2020 film The Trial of the Chicago 7, directed by Aaron Sorkin. Daniel Pemberton written and composed the film score in his third collaboration with Sorkin after Steve Jobs (2015) and Molly's Game (2017). The soundtrack, which featured three original songs performed by British singer Celeste, was released digitally under American record label Varèse Sarabande and Universal Music Group on October 16, 2020. A physical CD edition of the soundtrack was released on November 20.

Background 
Pemberton had composed the film score during the COVID-19 pandemic lockdown at his studio in London, but he could not record the score due to the pandemic restrictions. When the restrictions were partially lifted during late-2020, Pemberton managed to record the score, which took place in Studio Two at Abbey Road Studios. The score was conducted by Sam Okell, with assistance from Christopher Parker and Jack Thomason. The string session, consisted of 40 players recording the tracks, as Pemberton stated that "A lot of the score is actually about detail rather than numbers, so stuff like the riot cues and the opening, a lot of that is not about numbers, it’s about capturing those details."

While, there had no plans for incorporating songs in the film, three original songs were composed and had performed by British singer Celeste. The track "Hear My Voice" was served as the lead single and was released on September 30, 2020. Prior to the official release, "Hear My Voice" was submitted to the 93rd Academy Awards for Best Original Song in September 2020. Sorkin initially wanted to reuse The Beatles' track "Here Comes the Sun" (1969), to feature in the end-credits to conclude the film "with a note of positivity, a moment of light and hope at the end". But, as the track being incorporated by several artists, including Pemberton for Yesterday (2019), he decided against it. As a result "Hear My Voice" was composed. Celeste's vocals were approved by Pemberton, as "it takes back to the courtroom period of 1969".

The score was built on four key sequences: the opening, the two riot sequences and the conclusion. In the first meeting with Pemberton and Solkin, the former submitted four cues for the scenes, which Solkin stated that "everything is relying on these moments for the film to work as a whole. It’s not like underscore". He identified these sequences as the musical pillars of the film and wanted to be "strongly cinematic". Pemberton later composed "Hear My Voice", which Solkin felt that the score was subtly changed. He explained, in an interview to The Wrap, saying "Everything moves toward that song – the whole score is constructed to end on that song. When I first wrote it, the melody got reversed-engineered into the whole score. So that by the time it comes at the end, you’ve had it hinted at a number of different places in the score, and that’s the moment it all comes together." "Blood on the Streets" was released as a promotional single on October 9, 2020. Following, the digital and physical releases, a Vinyl edition of the soundtrack was released on February 26, 2021.

Track listing

Accolades

Notes

References

External links 
 

2020 soundtrack albums
2020s film soundtrack albums
Drama film soundtracks
Varèse Sarabande soundtracks
Universal Music Group soundtracks